My Fictions is an American post-hardcore band from Lowell, Massachusetts.

History
My Fictions released their first EP, I Want Nothing, in 2011 on Flannel Gurl Records. in 2012, My Fictions signed with Topshelf Records. My Fictions released another EP in 2012 on Topshelf Records titled Always Trapped. In 2013, My Fictions released a split with the band The Saddest Landscape on Topshelf Records titled When You Are Close, I Am Gone. In 2014, My Fictions released their debut full-length album on Topshelf Records titled Stranger Songs.

Discography
Studio albums
Stranger Songs (2014, Topshelf)
Singles & EPs
I Want Nothing (2011, Flannel Gurl)
Merrill & The Lucinda (2011, No Label) 
Always Trapped (2012, Topshelf)
Time Immemorial (2021, No label, Wolves of Hades)
Disguise (2022, No Label)
Splits
My Fictions/Aviator - (2010, No Label)
My Fictions/The Saddest Landscape - When You Are Close, I Am Gone (2013, Topshelf)

References

American post-hardcore musical groups
Topshelf Records artists
Musical groups from Massachusetts